Lac de Saint-Cassien is a reservoir in Var, France. At an elevation of 147 m, its surface area is 3.7 km2.

References

Saint Cassien
Landforms of Var (department)